Zophopetes is a genus of skippers in the family Hesperiidae.

Species
Zophopetes cerymica (Hewitson, 1867)
Zophopetes dysmephila (Trimen, 1868)
Zophopetes ganda Evans, 1937
Zophopetes haifa Evans, 1937
Zophopetes nobilior (Holland, 1896)
Zophopetes quaternata (Mabille, 1876)

References
Natural History Museum Lepidoptera genus database
Seitz, A. Die Gross-Schmetterlinge der Erde 13: Die Afrikanischen Tagfalter. Plate XIII 80

External links
Zophopetes at funet

Erionotini
Hesperiidae genera